Fabio Ramella is a Swiss sport shooter. At the 2012 Summer Olympics he competed in the Men's skeet, finishing in 34th place.

References

Swiss male sport shooters
Year of birth missing (living people)
Living people
Olympic shooters of Switzerland
Shooters at the 2012 Summer Olympics
Place of birth missing (living people)
Shooters at the 2015 European Games
European Games competitors for Switzerland
21st-century Swiss people